Sega GT, released in Japan as , is a sim racing video game co-developed by Wow Entertainment and TOSE, and published by Sega for their Dreamcast home console. The game was released in 2000. A Microsoft Windows version was published the following year—in Japan and North America by Sega, and in Europe by Empire Interactive.

Sega GT was intended by Sega to rival Sony's popular Gran Turismo racing series, which was driving the strong sales of the PlayStation console and raising interest in the Dreamcast's closest competitor, the yet-unreleased PlayStation 2.  While Sega GT was met with positive reception, sales were only modest, and the Dreamcast was given little traction against its competition. Despite this, Sega would continue the series on the Xbox with a sequel titled, Sega GT 2002 following the demise of the Dreamcast console.

Gameplay
In Sega GT'''s Championship Mode, the player competes in various races across 22 different tracks in an effort to gain licenses and win cups. Collected prize money can be used to buy additional cars and mechanical parts. The game also features a car creation mode where players can build a custom vehicle from scratch using acquired parts, or can modify any of their existing vehicles.

The game features over 130 selectable cars from manufacturers such as Dodge, Ford, Toyota, and Mitsubishi, with the handling of each being based on the specifications of its real-life counterpart. The European version of Sega GT would include additional cars from Alfa Romeo, Fiat, Mercedes-Benz, Audi, and others.

Reception

The Dreamcast version of Sega GT received "favorable" reviews according to the review aggregation website Metacritic. Critics praised said console version's generous content and customization options, but found that the controls could sometimes be difficult. Frank O'Connor of NextGen said in the May 2000 issue that reviewing the Japanese import "seems to come down to making comparisons with Gran Turismo, and that's unfortunate, because on its own merits, Sega GT Homologation Special is stunning." Seven issues later, Jeff Lundrigan said of the North American version, "If you only buy one racing game for Dreamcast, make it this one. In fact, run out and buy it anyway, just on principle." Edge, however, gave the Japanese import five out of ten, saying, "The fundamental problem with Sega GT is the game's inability to decide whether to stay close to Sega's arcade roots or venture down the simulation route, choosing instead to hover uncomfortably somewhere in between." In Japan, Famitsu gave said console version a score of 33 out of 40.

See also
Gran Turismo seriesDriving Emotion Type-SF355 ChallengeMetropolis Street Racer''

Notes

References

External links
Sega GT Manual

2000 video games
Dreamcast games
Racing simulators
Racing video games
Sega Games franchises
Sega video games
Windows games
WOW Entertainment games
Video games developed in Japan